Dary Holm (born Anna Maria Dorothea Meyer; 16 April 1897 – 29 August 1960) was a German actress. She married film star Harry Piel in 1927. Holm starred alongside Piel in several films, such as Johnny Steals Europe (1932).

Selected filmography
 In the Ecstasy of Billions (1920)
 Martin Luther (1923)
 The Emperor's Old Clothes (1923)
 The Woman from the Orient (1923)
 The Affair of Baroness Orlovska (1923)
 Hunted Women (1923)
 Dangerous Clues (1924)
 Around a Million (1924)
 The Man Without Nerves (1924)
 The Tragedy of a Night of Passion (1924)
 Zigano (1925)
 Swifter Than Death (1925)
 Adventure on the Night Express (1925)
 Wrath of the Seas (1926)
 The Violet Eater (1926)
The Black Pierrot (1926)
 Night of Mystery (1927)
 Panic (1928)
 Man Against Man (1928)
 Men Without Work (1929)
 His Best Friend (1929)
 Achtung! – Auto-Diebe! (1930)
 Shadows of the Underworld (1931)
 Johnny Steals Europe (1932)

References

Bibliography
 Bleckman, Matias. Harry Piel: Ein Kino-Mythos und seine Zeit. Filminstitut der Landeshaupstadt Düsseldorf, 1992. 
 Grange, William. Cultural Chronicle of the Weimar Republic. Scarecrow Press, 2008.

External links

1897 births
1960 deaths
German silent film actresses
German film actresses
Actresses from Hamburg
20th-century German actresses